College Milton is an area of the Scottish new town East Kilbride, in South Lanarkshire.

It lies on the western edge of the town, bordering West Mains, and consists of a large industrial estate, split into Northern and Southern halves by the A726 road.

Areas of East Kilbride
Business parks of Scotland
Industrial parks in the United Kingdom
Economy of South Lanarkshire